Amanda Michalopoulou (born 1966) is a Greek author. She has published three novels, several collections of short stories and books for children. Her works been widely translated and have won the National Endowment for the Arts' International Literature Award 2008, the Revmata Prize, and the Diavazo Award.

Biography 
Michalopoulou was born in Athens, Greece, in 1966, and currently teaches creative writing. She previously studied French literature in Athens, and journalism in Paris. She lives in Athens and Paris, with her husband Dimitris Tsoumplekas.

Career 
Michalopoulou began writing short stories, and won the Best Short Story Prize from Revmata, a Greek literary magazine, in 1993. In 1994, she published her first collection of short stories, Éxo i zoi ine políchromi (1994; tr: Life is colourful out there). Her other collections of short stories, published subsequently, include Ich mach euch den Garaus (2002; "I'll finish you all off") and Tha Ithela (2008; "I'd Like"). Tha Ithela won several awards for the English translation, including the National Endowment for the Arts' International Literature Award 2008, and was on the long list for the Best Translated Book Award. Her stories have been published in the Harvard Review, PEN Magazine, World Literature Today and The Guardian.

She went on to write several novels, including Jandes (1996; "Octopus Garden"), which won the Diavazo Critics' Prize in Greece; Osses forés antéxis (1998; "As many times as you can bear it"), Paliókeros (2001; "Bloody awful weather"), Pos na kryfteis (2010; "How to Hide"), and Lamperi mera (2012; "Bright Day").  Michalopoulou has also written several children's books, including I Hina (2008; "The Goose"). Her works have been translated into 20 languages. She was a contributing editor for the newspaper Kathimerini from 1990 to 2008.

Works
 Έξω η ζωή είναι πολύχρωμη, Εκδόσεις Καστανιώτη, 1994
 Γιάντες, Εκδόσεις Καστανιώτη, 1996
 Το σπίτι που πετάει, Άμμος, 1997
 Όσες φορές αντέξεις, Εκδόσεις Καστανιώτη, 1998
 Γιατί γεννήθηκα, Εκδόσεις Πατάκη, 2000
 Δύο σπίτια, Εκδόσεις Πατάκη, 2000
 Τ' αγαπημένα μου Σαββατοκύριακα, Εκδόσεις Πατάκη, 2000
 Παλιόκαιρος, Εκδόσεις Καστανιώτη, 2001
 Inbox, Απόπειρα, 2002
 Γιατί σκότωσα την καλύτερή μου φίλη, Εκδόσεις Καστανιώτη, 2003
 Αρκεί να μην κόψω τα μαλλιά μου, Εκδόσεις Πατάκη, 2004
 Η μετακόμιση, Εκδόσεις Παπαδόπουλος, 2004
 Οι περιπέτειες της Αεροπλανούλας, Εκδόσεις Πατάκη, 2004
 Θα ήθελα, Εκδόσεις Καστανιώτη, 2005
 Η μετακόμιση, Εκδόσεις Παπαδόπουλος, 2006
 Η εγγονή του Αϊ-Βασίλη, Εκδόσεις Καστανιώτη, 2007
 Πριγκίπισσα Σαύρα, Εκδόσεις Καστανιώτη, 2007
 Εμπιστοσύνη, Τόπος, 2008
 Η χήνα, Εκδόσεις Καστανιώτη, 2008
 Ο Ισίδωρος και ο ναυαγός, Εκδόσεις Πατάκη, 2008
 Η εγγονή του Αϊ-Βασίλη και τα μπισκότα της αγάπης, Εκδόσεις Καστανιώτη, 2009
 Διακοπές στο σπίτι με τον Ισίδωρο, Εκδόσεις Πατάκη, 2010
 Πώς να κρυφτείς, Εκδόσεις Καστανιώτη, 2010
 Η εγγονή του Αϊ-Βασίλη και η εξαφάνιση των ξωτικών, Εκδόσεις Καστανιώτη, 2011
 Όσες φορές αντέξεις, Έθνος, 2011
 Παλιόκαιρος, Έθνος, 2011
 Τ + Υ = Αγάπη για πάντα, Εκδόσεις Πατάκη, 2011
 Έρχεται ο Ίνξορ, Εκδόσεις Πατάκη, 2012
 Λαμπερή μέρα, Εκδόσεις Καστανιώτη, 2012
 Έξω η ζωή είναι πολύχρωμη, Εκδόσεις Καστανιώτη, 2014
 Η γυναίκα του Θεού, Εκδόσεις Καστανιώτη, 2014
 Γιάντες, Εκδόσεις Καστανιώτη, 2018
 Μπαρόκ, Εκδόσεις Καστανιώτη, 2018

References 

1966 births
Writers from Athens
21st-century Greek novelists
21st-century Greek women writers
Living people
21st-century short story writers
20th-century Greek novelists
20th-century Greek women writers
20th-century short story writers
Greek women novelists
Greek women short story writers
Greek short story writers